Heinrich August Vater (5 September 1859 in Bremen – 10 February 1930 in Dresden) was a German soil scientist and forestry scientist. Vater was a pioneer in the areas of forest soil science, land evaluation, and forest fertilization.

In 1884 he received his doctorate at Leipzig with the dissertation Die fossilen Hölzer der Phosphoritlager des Herzogthums Braunschweig. He was an employee of the Royal Saxon Geological Survey, and in 1886 qualified as a lecturer of mineralogy and geology at the Polytechnic Institute in Dresden. During the following year, he became a professor at the Academy of Forestry in Tharandt. In 1898 he became a member of the Deutsche Akademie der Naturforscher Leopoldina.

Selected publications 
 Die Bewurzelung der Kiefer, Fichte und Buche, Berlin : P. Parey, 1927.
 Beiträge zur Kenntnis der Humusauflage von Fichte und Kiefer, Berlin : P. Parey, 1928.

References 

German foresters
Scientists from Bremen
German soil scientists
1859 births
1930 deaths